Søren Wærenskjold (born 12 March 2000) is a Norwegian cyclist, who rides for UCI ProTeam .

Major results

Road

2017
 1st  Overall Internationale Niedersachsen-Rundfahrt
1st  Young rider classification
1st  Points classification
 National Junior Championships
2nd Time trial
3rd Road race
 4th Overall Grand Prix Rüebliland
1st Stage 4
 10th Overall Trofeo Karlsberg
1st  Young rider classification
 10th Overall Trophée Centre Morbihan
2018
 1st  Time trial, National Junior Championships
 1st  Overall Saarland Trofeo
1st Stage 3a
 2nd Gent–Wevelgem Juniors
 3rd Overall Trophée Centre Morbihan
1st Stage 2a (ITT)
 5th Time trial, UCI World Junior Championships
2019
 5th Youngster Coast Challenge
 6th Ringerike GP
2020
 1st  Overall International Tour of Rhodes
1st  Young rider classification
1st Stages 1 & 3
2021 
 Tour de l'Avenir
1st Prologue & Stage 1
 1st Prologue Grand Prix Priessnitz spa
 2nd  Time trial, UEC European Under-23 Championships
 2nd Time trial, National Championships
 4th Time trial, UCI World Under-23 Championships
 5th Circuit de Wallonie
2022
 UCI World Under-23 Championships
1st  Time trial
3rd  Road race
 1st  Road race, National Under-23 Championships
 1st Stage 1 Tour de l'Avenir
 2nd Time trial, National Championships
 2nd Chrono des Nations Under-23
 7th Bredene Koksijde Classic
 8th Kattekoers
2023
 1st Stage 3 Saudi Tour

Cyclo-cross
2018–2019
 3rd National Championships
2019–2020
 1st  National Championships

References

External links

2000 births
Living people
Norwegian male cyclists
People from Mandal, Norway
Sportspeople from Agder